The Singapore Democratic Alliance (abbreviation: SDA) is an opposition  political coalition between the National Solidarity Party (NSP) and Singapore Justice Party (SJP) in Singapore.

History
Prior to the founding in 2001, then-opposition Member of Parliament (MP) for Potong Pasir Chiam See Tong was a member of Singapore Democratic Party (SDP). Chiam resigned to join Singapore People's Party (SPP) ahead of the 1997 elections due to a leadership schism with another member, Chee Soon Juan, who was made the party's secretary-general.

The party was first established in 2001 by Chiam where he want to provide a common grouping under which different opposition parties could stand as a political coalition in elections against the ruling People's Action Party (PAP). The alliance was initially a four-party coalition, which consist of his party of SPP (which adopted the party's logo at the time), as well as the National Solidarity Party (NSP), the Singapore Justice Party (SJP) and the Singapore Malay National Organization (PKMS). Notable members include Cheo Chai Chen and Tan Lead Shake of the SDP and Democratic Progressive Party (DPP) respectively, later joined the SDA where they represent the NSP. The alliance of four parties contested in both the 2001 and 2006 elections. It was the first coalition in post-independence since 1963, after the now-defunct Singapore Alliance Party.

After the 2006 elections, two parties withdrew from the SDA before the next election; In 2007, the NSP withdrew in hopes of rejuvenating the party, and later on 2 March 2011, the SPP, after Chiam, mostly due to health reasons, was relieved of his role as chairman after the Council voted for three days earlier, and SPP further cited their disagreements (notably the PKMS) for attempting to invite Reform Party (RP), a party which was newly formed on 3 July 2008, to SDA, and also fielding a successor for the ward (who later went on to choose Chiam's wife, Lina Loh) while Chiam would go to contest Bishan-Toa Payoh GRC. SDA now consists of PKMS and SJP. The chairperson was later succeeded by the SJP's leader Desmond Lim, notable for helping Chiam in managing his town council funds.

However, the separation of Chiam's SPP saw waning on the alliance, where they fell short on winning the elections. In the 2011 elections, neither the NSP (who field a large slate of candidates for the election), SDA, or SPP were successful: SPP's Loh was made a Non-Constituency Member of Parliament although losing the contest to a three-time PAP candidate Sitoh Yih Pin, by a wafer-thin margin of 0.72% or 114 votes; candidate Desmond Lim became the only candidate forfeiting his electoral deposit (S$16,000) in the only three-cornered contest in the newly formed Punggol East SMC (a ward carved out from the neighbouring Pasir Ris-Punggol GRC, which the alliance also contest); and members who joined as independents contesting in Tanjong Pagar GRC (the election's only uncontested constituency) was disqualified during nomination day. In the 2015 election, SDA fielded their only team of six in the only contested constituency of Pasir Ris–Punggol GRC, but with no success.

In the 2013 by-election, Lim contested again, but later conceded defeat during vote counting; ultimately, he garnered only 0.53% of the valid votes cast for the election, resulting him as the second candidate in history (after United People's Front candidate Harbans Singh) to have his deposit forfeited on both times, and consequently set its record-worst score for a candidate in post-independence Singapore.

The party contested in the 2020 election, with the election marked Lim's last election leading the party. Their party only contested Pasir Ris-Punggol GRC, which produced a rare three-cornered contest against a third party, Peoples Voice, making it only the second time in the election's history a multi-cornered fight occurred within a GRC (the first being 1992's by-election under Marine Parade GRC). The party scored 23.67% of the votes while PV ended up losing their deposits after garnering 12.18%. Prior to the elections, there was a joint alliance between the four parties, Singaporeans First, People's Power Party, Reform Party and Democratic Progressive Party, who initially announced to form an alliance of their own, but ended up applying for the SDA on 1 April and has never materialized.

Leadership

Former elected Members of Parliament

Electoral history
Due to an alliance, the number of respective seats and the results combined from the four parties (NSP, SJP, SPP and PKMS) were reflected in the table. NSP and SPP left after the 2006 general election.

Parliament

Parliament By-elections

References

External links

2001 establishments in Singapore
Political parties established in 2001
Political parties in Singapore
Political party alliances in Asia